The Wallace E. Pratt House, also known as Ship on the Desert (sometimes hyphenated), was the residence of Wallace Pratt in what is now Guadalupe Mountains National Park in far western Texas. Pratt, a petroleum geologist for the Humble Oil & Refining Company, had previously built the Wallace Pratt Lodge in McKittrick Canyon a couple of miles to the north in the Guadalupe Mountains. Finding the cabin site to be remote and prone to being cut off by flooding, Pratt started construction of a new, modern residence on the east slope of the mountains. Work on the residence started in 1941. The house was designed by Long Island architect Newton Bevin, who lived for a time at the site with his wife, and built by contractor Ed Birdsall. Work was stopped by World War II, but resumed in 1945 and was completed the same year. In contrast to Pratt's rustic canyon cabin, the house, which Pratt named the Ship On The Desert, is an International Style house with horizontal lines and extensive glazing. The majority of the house is on a single level, with a "captain's bridge" over the dining room giving access to a rooftop terrace. A detached garage contained a guest bedroom. Apart from glass, the predominant material was local limestone in several shades.

Pratt and his wife, Iris, lived at the Ship On The Desert until 1963, when Pratt's health dictated a move to Tucson, Arizona. It was used as a residence for National Park Service employees. The house is occasionally open for tours sponsored by the National Park Service.

The house was featured on the National Trust for Historic Preservation's 2018 list of most-endangered historic locations. It was listed on the National Register of Historic Places on December 15, 2011.

See also

National Register of Historic Places listings in Culberson County, Texas
National Register of Historic Places listings in Guadalupe Mountains National Park

References

External links
Ship On The Desert at the National Park Service
Ship On The Desert at Guadalupe Mountains National Park
National Register of Historic Places Registration Form

Houses completed in 1945
Houses in Culberson County, Texas
National Register of Historic Places in Guadalupe Mountains National Park
Houses on the National Register of Historic Places in Texas
National Register of Historic Places in Culberson County, Texas